Sigurbjörn Einarsson (30 June 1911 – 28 August 2008) was an Icelandic clergyman and doctor of theology who served as the Bishop of Iceland (head of the Lutheran Church of Iceland) 1959–1981. His son, Karl Sigurbjörnsson, later served as Bishop of Iceland 1998–2012. An older son Þorkell Sigurbjörnsson (or Thorkell Sigurbjörnsson) (born 1938 - died in 2013) was an Icelandic composer, conductor and pianist.
Contents

Sigurbjörn Einarsson has been referred to as one of the greatest poets in the Icelandic language of his era, and a book of his poems, titled Eigi stjörnum ofar – sálmar og ljóð, was published in 2008.

References
Sigurbjörn Einarsson's obituary 
Eigi stjörnum ofar – sálmar og ljó

1911 births
2008 deaths
Sigurbjorn Einarsson